Homer Township is one of the fourteen townships of Morgan County, Ohio, United States.  The 2000 census found 976 people in the township.

Geography
Located in the southwestern corner of the county, it borders the following townships:
Union Township - north
Marion Township - east
Bern Township, Athens County - southeast corner
Ames Township, Athens County - south
Dover Township, Athens County - southwest corner
Trimble Township, Athens County - west
Monroe Township, Perry County - northwest

No municipalities are located in Homer Township.

Name and history
Statewide, the only other Homer Township is located in Medina County.

Government
The township is governed by a three-member board of trustees, who are elected in November of odd-numbered years to a four-year term beginning on the following January 1. Two are elected in the year after the presidential election and one is elected in the year before it. There is also an elected township fiscal officer, who serves a four-year term beginning on April 1 of the year after the election, which is held in November of the year before the presidential election. Vacancies in the fiscal officership or on the board of trustees are filled by the remaining trustees.

As of 2007, the trustees are Greg Cable, James Hogue, and Jim Keirns, and the clerk is Brenda Custer.

References

External links
County website

Townships in Morgan County, Ohio
Townships in Ohio